This is a list of notable people who are Muslims and reside in, or are citizens of, Canada.

Politicians

Federal
Majid Jowhari - Liberal MP for Richmond Hill (2015–present)  
Ali Ehsassi - Liberal MP for  Willowdale (2015–present)     
Omar Alghabra - Liberal MP for Mississauga—Erindale (2006–2008) and Mississauga Centre (2015–present).
Salma Ataullahjan - Conservative Senator for Ontario (2010–present).
Sadia Groguhé - NDP MP for Saint-Lambert (2011-2015).
Sana Hassainia - NDP MP for Verchères—Les Patriotes (2011-2015).
Mobina Jaffer - Liberal Senator for British Columbia (2001–present).
Rahim Jaffer - Conservative MP for Edmonton–Strathcona (1997–2008); first Muslim MP elected in Canada.
Wajid Khan - Conservative MP for Mississauga—Streetsville (2004–2008).
Maryam Monsef - Liberal MP for Peterborough—Kawartha (2015–2021); first Muslim Cabinet Minister.
Yasmin Ratansi - Liberal MP for Don Valley East (2004–2011, 2015–2021).
Djaouida Sellah - NDP MP for Saint-Bruno—Saint-Hubert (2011-2015).
Arif Virani - Liberal MP for Parkdale—High Park (2015–present).
Taleeb Noormohamed - Liberal MP for Vancouver Granville (2021–present)
Ziad Aboultaif - Conservative MP for Edmonton Manning (2015–present)
Ahmed Hussen - Liberal MP for York South-Weston (2015–present)
Iqra Khalid - Liberal MP for Mississauga-Erin Mills (2015–present)
Shafqat Ali - Liberal MP for Brampton Centre (2021–present)
Yasir Naqvi - Liberal MP for Ottawa Centre (2021–present)
Salma Zahid - Liberal MP for Scarborough Centre (2015–present)
Sameer Zuberi - Liberal MP for Pierrefonds-Dollard (2019–present)

Provincial
Moe Amery - Alberta Conservative MLA for Calgary-East (1993-2015).
Peter Baker - Northwest Territories Independent MLA for Mackenzie North (1964-1967).
Muhammad Fiaz - Saskatchewan SP MLA for Regina Pasqua (2015–present).
Fatima Houda-Pepin - Quebec Liberal MNA for La Pinière (1994-2014).
Amir Khadir - Quebec QS MLA for Mercier (2008–present).
Stephen Khan - Alberta Conservative MLA for St. Albert (2008-2015). 
Yasir Naqvi - Ontario Liberal MPP for Ottawa Centre (2007–2018).
John Nuraney - British Columbia Liberal MLA for Burnaby-Willingdon (2001-2009).
Shafiq Qaadri - Ontario Liberal MPP for Etobicoke North (2003–present).
Doly Begum - Ontario NDP MPP for Scarborough Southwest (2018–present).
Sohail Quadri - Alberta Conservative MLA for Edmonton-Mill Woods (2012-2015).
Khalil Ramal - Ontario Liberal MPP for London-Fanashawe (2003-2011).
Irfan Sabir - Alberta NDP MLA for Calgary-McCall (2015–present).
Larry Shaben - Alberta Conservative MLA for Lesser Slave Lake (1975–1989).
Shiraz Shariff - Alberta Conservative MLA for Calgary McCall (1995-2008).
Muhammad Yaseen - Alberta United Conservative MLA for Calgary North (2019–present)
Salma Lakhani - Lieutenant Governor of Alberta (2020–present)

Municipal
Naheed Nenshi - Mayor of Calgary (2010–2021)

Academic figures 

Faisal Kutty - lawyer and law professor
Dr. Iqbal "Ike" Ahmed - world renowned ophthalmologist, educator, inventor, and innovator. Recipient of the Top 40 under 40 award in 2009.

Journalism 
Mohamed Fahmy - journalist, arrested in Egypt
Irshad Manji - feminist, author, journalist, activist
Omar Sachedina - anchorman and journalist, CTV
Haroon Siddiqui - newspaper journalist, columnist, and a former editor of the Toronto Star
Farah Nasser - anchor and journalist, Global News
Ginella Massa - journalist, CityNews
Raheel Raza - journalist, author, public speaker, media consultant, anti-racism activist, and interfaith discussion leader
Hodan Nalayeh - media executive, marketing consultant, social activist and entrepreneur
Tarek Fatah - journalist and author and founder of the Muslim Canadian Congress

Religious leaders 
 Jamal Badawi
 Zijad Delic - imam and community leader
 Amir Hussain - editor of the Journal of the American Academy of Religion
 Ahmad Kutty - religious scholar
 Ingrid Mattson
 Reza Hosseini Nassab
 Muhammad Tahir-ul-Qadri - professor of international constitutional law at the University of the Punjab and the founding chairman of Minhaj-ul-Quran International

Leaders 
 Ahmed Hussen - lawyer and National President of the Canadian Somali Congress
 Faisal Kutty - community leader, activist and law professor
 Hamid Slimi - imam and community leader
 Dr. Ahmet Fuad Sahin - founder of IDRF, philanthropist and advocate for interfaith dialogue. Recipient of the Order of Canada.

Entertainment 
Sulekha Ali - singer-songwriter
Belly - Palestinian-Canadian rapper
Ali Hassan - comedian
Tariq Hussain - singer-songwriter, broadcaster
Ladan Hussein - musician also known as Cold Specks
K'naan - singer-songwriter
Nabil Rajo - actor
Narcy - Yaseen Al Salman, Hiphop singer and journalist with ancestors from Iraq.
Zarqa Nawaz - created Little Mosque on the Prairie
Dawud Wharnsby - singer-songwriter, poet
Imane Anys - streamer, YouTuber

Literature
Mohamed Abdulkarim Ali - memoirist
Samra Habib - artist, memoirist
Hasan Namir - novelist, poet
Arsham Parsi - activist, autobiographer
Ahmad Danny Ramadan - novelist
Kamal Al-Solaylee - journalist, memoirist'

Sports 
 Nazem Kadri - ice hockey player, 2009 draft pick of the Toronto Maple Leafs, first Muslim to win the Stanley Cup.
 Sami Zayn - WWE Wrestler
 Adnan Virk - ESPN Sports Anchor, born in Toronto.

Business 

 Ali Abouchadi - pioneer, entrepreneur and fur trader with the Cree people.

See also
Islam in Canada
List of Canadian Shia Muslims
List of converts to Islam
List of Islamic and Muslim related topics
Lists of Muslims
Lists of people by belief

References 

Canadian
 List